Buffard is a commune in the Doubs department in the Bourgogne-Franche-Comté region in eastern France.

Population

Personalities
Armand-Émile Mathey-Doret (born 1853 in Besançon, Doubs – 1931 in Buffard) was the only French artist to be allowed by Queen Victoria to make pictures of her. He received the French Legion of Honor in 1901. He was elected Mayor circa 1908. His art-works are at the following museums held at the Hermitage Museum (Lord Warton), Le Louvre (portrait de Charles 1er d'Angleterre / Ruppert de bavière et son frère), and Windsor Castle (Rubens).

See also
 Communes of the Doubs department

References

Communes of Doubs